Marco António Simões Caneira (born 9 February 1979) is a Portuguese former professional footballer. Preferably a central defender, he was equally at ease on the right or left flank.

A youth graduate at Sporting CP, he started his career at the club, also appearing briefly for Benfica in his country, and represented Valencia in La Liga for a couple of years before returning to Sporting. Over ten seasons, he amassed Primeira Liga totals of 126 matches and one goal. He retired in 2015, after a four-year stint with Videoton.

Internationally, Caneira appeared for Portugal at two World Cups and earned 25 caps in six years.

Club career

Early years
Born in the village of Negrais in Sintra, Lisbon, Caneira began his career at the Sporting CP youth system, eventually graduating to the senior squad and making his first-team debut while still only a junior (aged 17). After signing a professional contract, he immediately went on loan to fellow Primeira Liga club S.C. Beira-Mar.

Caneira, along with fellow Sporting players Paulo Costa and Vasco Faísca, was then involved in a somewhat complicated 2000 transfer between F.C. Alverca, who now owned 50% of their rights, and Inter Milan. He was immediately sent to Reggina Calcio, in a co-ownership bid. After a season, he was bought back from Reggina and sent to S.L. Benfica on a one-year-long loan.

Bordeaux and Valencia
Caneira left for another loan spell in summer 2001, this time with FC Girondins de Bordeaux. At the end of the campaign, the French signed him to a four-year contract.

After his second season, Caneira was loaned out again, this time to Valencia CF which had faced Bordeaux twice in the 2003–04 edition of the UEFA Champions League. The move was made permanent on 13 June 2005.

Sporting CP
After one and a half seasons at Valencia, Caneira returned to Portugal and Sporting in January 2006, where he displayed consistent defensive performances, also scoring a rare goal against former owners Inter Milan in the following season's Champions League, in a 12 September home win (1–0). In August 2007, although he had reached an agreement for a further five-year loan with the Lions, he returned to the Quique Sánchez Flores-led team.

After appearing rarely on the second Valencia stint, Caneira returned for a third one with Sporting, for €3.5 million, signing a four-year deal on 25 June 2008. He appeared in 32 official games in his first season (21 in the league, helping his team to the second place), but fell out of favour in the following years, inclusively not being given a jersey for the 2010–11 campaign, and he left the club in June 2011.

Later career
On the last day of the 2011 summer transfer window, the 32-year-old Caneira signed with Videoton FC in Hungary, sharing teams with three compatriots including former international teammate Paulo Sousa, who acted as the club's manager. On 25 October 2012 he scored only his fourth goal as a professional, netting from close range after a corner kick in an eventual 2–1 home victory against FC Basel in the UEFA Europa League group stage.

Caneira left the Sóstói Stadion at the end of the 2014–15 season, having contributed only three appearances to the club's second Nemzeti Bajnokság I conquest. After one year out football, the 36-year-old came out of retirement and joined amateurs SRD Negrais in the Lisbon Football Association.

International career
A Portugal international since 2002, Caneira was selected for the squad that appeared in that year's FIFA World Cup, but did not play in the tournament held in Japan and South Korea. He made his debut on 27 March, in a 1–4 friendly loss to Finland in Porto.

Left out of the squad for UEFA Euro 2004, Caneira returned for the 2006 World Cup, playing in Portugal's last group stage match against Mexico (2–1 win).

Personal life
On 16 January 2005, Caneira's 8-month-old daughter was a victim of sudden death, shortly before Valencia's La Liga match against CA Osasuna, which ended 0–0.

In October 2009, while still an active player, Caneira ran for office in the Almargem do Bispo civil parish in his native Sintra, losing the election by 32 votes.

Career statistics

Club

International

Honours

Club
Sporting CP
Taça de Portugal: 2006–07
Supertaça Cândido de Oliveira: 2008
Taça da Liga runner-up: 2008–09

Beira-Mar
Taça de Portugal: 1998–99

Valencia
Copa del Rey: 2007–08
UEFA Super Cup: 2004

Videoton
Nemzeti Bajnokság I: 2014–15
Szuperkupa: 2011, 2012
Ligakupa: 2011–12

International
Portugal
UEFA European Under-16 Championship: 1995

Orders
Medal of Merit, Order of the Immaculate Conception of Vila Viçosa (House of Braganza)

References

External links

1979 births
Living people
People from Sintra
Sportspeople from Lisbon District
Portuguese footballers
Association football defenders
Primeira Liga players
Segunda Divisão players
S.C. Salgueiros players
Sporting CP footballers
S.C. Beira-Mar players
F.C. Alverca players
S.L. Benfica footballers
Serie A players
Reggina 1914 players
Ligue 1 players
FC Girondins de Bordeaux players
La Liga players
Valencia CF players
Nemzeti Bajnokság I players
Fehérvár FC players
Portugal youth international footballers
Portugal under-21 international footballers
Portugal B international footballers
Portugal international footballers
2002 FIFA World Cup players
2006 FIFA World Cup players
Portuguese expatriate footballers
Expatriate footballers in Italy
Expatriate footballers in France
Expatriate footballers in Spain
Expatriate footballers in Hungary
Portuguese expatriate sportspeople in Italy
Portuguese expatriate sportspeople in France
Portuguese expatriate sportspeople in Spain
Portuguese expatriate sportspeople in Hungary